Rogde is a surname. Notable people with the surname include:

Ingolf Rogde (1911–1978), Norwegian actor
Isak Rogde (1947–2010), Norwegian translator